Shotmaker was a Canadian post-hardcore/emo group formed in 1993 by Matt, Tim, and Nick from Belleville and Ottawa, Ontario.

History 
Shotmaker's catalogue comprises three 7"s, two full-length LP's and a 12" split EP.  There is also a Shotmaker Demo Tape which is not included in the Complete Discography Double CD.

The group parted ways in 1996, but released their double CD retrospective The Complete Discography: 1993-1996 in 2000, comprising almost the entirety of their recorded material (not including a Demo Tape), including several tracks exclusive to compilations and three unreleased songs. 33 of the 43 tracks were lifted straight from vinyl due to DAT tapes being lost.

From their first 7" (pulled due to unauthorized use of the cover photo) to their final LP, Shotmaker's success lies in the intermingling of explosive riffs and complex, flowing rhythms, creating tensions best exhibited in Table, where tempos and time signatures shuffle in and out at break-neck speed. However, a number of disparate moods are explored, such as the abrasive curve or the restrained controller.controller. The trio approach catchy on 10/22/94, and an untitled instrumental track on their final album includes nothing but acoustic guitar played over radio frequency white noise.

The lyrics are rather ambiguous, sung and screamed with an urgency that complements the unyielding compositions. There is a sincerity about something, but just exactly what is open for interpretation.

Shotmaker's members went on to play in such bands as the short lived 30 Second Motion Picture, Three Penny Opera, and The Grey. Matt is currently in The Dark Plains.

Trivia 

 The band Controller.Controller took their name from a song on Mouse Ear [Forget-Me-Not].
 The vinyl LP "The Crayon Club" has accidentally (?) written "The Candy Club" on the spine of the sleeve.

Discography 
Albums

Singles/EP's

Compilation Contributions

Compilations

References

External links
 Shawn Scallen Photo Page
 Troubleman Unlimited
 Ebullition Records
 Someone's Shotmaker MySpace Page

Emo musical groups
Canadian hardcore punk groups
Musical groups from Ottawa
Musical groups established in 1993
1993 establishments in Ontario